Lüsingu Landscape Conservation Area is a nature park is located in Järva County, Estonia.

Its area is 109 ha.

The protected area was founded in 2006 to protect versatile landscapes and karst areas in Ambla Parish.

References

Nature reserves in Estonia
Geography of Järva County